The 2021 European Cadet Judo Championships was an edition of the European U18 Judo Championships, organised by the European Judo Union. It was held in the Arena Riga in Riga, Latvia from 17–19 August 2021.

Event videos
The event will air freely on the EJU YouTube channel.

Medal overview

Men

Women

Medal table

References

External links
 

European Cadet Judo Championships
 U18
Judo
European Championships, U18
International sports competitions hosted by Latvia
European Judo U18 Championships